The World as It Is may refer to:

 "The World as It Is" (song) by Daryl Braithwaite 
 The World as It Is (book) by Ben Rhodes
 The World As It Is: Dispatches on the Myth of Human Progress, book by Chris Hedges

See also
The World as It Is Today, album by Art Bears
 The World as I See It (disambiguation)